Łęgowo  (from 1938-45 Lengau) is a village in the administrative district of Gmina Olecko, within Olecko County, Warmian-Masurian Voivodeship, in north-eastern Poland.

It is located in the region of Masuria.

History
The origins of the village date back to 1561, when Stańko Olszewski bought land to establish a village. As of 1600, the population was solely Polish. In 1858, the village had a population of 281.

Transport
The Polish National road 65 runs nearby, east of the village.

References

Populated lakeshore places in Poland
Villages in Olecko County
1561 establishments in Poland
Populated places established in 1561